Verona Joseph (born 23 April 1974) is a British actress. She played the role of Jess Griffin in the BBC drama series Holby City between 2002 and 2007 and continued to appear as a recurring character from time to time.  In 2004, she appeared in the first series of the BBC dancing competition Strictly Come Dancing with her professional dance partner Paul Killick. She appeared in the first episode of series four of Doctor Who as Penny, a journalist.

Joseph married director Farren Blackburn in 2004.  She has a son Terrell and two daughters Elsie-Mae and Ruby Rose.

References

External links
 

1974 births
Living people
British actresses